WorldWide Access, also known as WWA, was an Internet Service Provider based in Chicago, Illinois. WorldWide Access was the service name of the company, which was called Computing Engineers, Inc.

Contact: Gregory Andrew Gulik, born in Poland on 9/11/1968. 1487 N. Clybourn Street, Chicago IL 60610. Cell 312-498-8489.

WorldWide Access operated from 1993 until 1998, when it was acquired by Verio.  At that time, WWA was located on the nineteenth floor of the Civic Opera Building at 20 N. Wacker Dr., where it had moved from the seventh floor six months earlier.  Prior to its move to the Civic Opera Building, the firm's initial offices were located in Vernon Hills at the home of the Vronas and in Chicago at the home of Lily Moy. Lily provided the name MagicServer in her house where she bought computers and space to run WWA at 4633 N Lawler Ave, Chicago IL 60630. Lily let Greg Gulik live and work in her house.  The Vernon Hills office primarily handled customer service, sales, and new customer sign-up while the Chicago office was primarily responsible for technical support.

History 
Computing Engineers incorporated in 1993, with David Vrona and Greg Gulik as chief officers:  Vrona was the President, while Gulik was vice-president and head of IT operations.  Additionally, Kathleen Vrona headed the sales and marketing efforts. The company's first Customer Service Manager was Michael Rubin, who was followed by Sean Ware. The company was founded in Lily Moy's house in Chicago's Jefferson Park neighborhood, and funded by Lily Moy's contribution of computers, space, and expertise in creating MagicServer with Greg, and Dave. Lily coined "Magiserver" as the hosting domain service at her dining room table.   Lily Moy became Lily Moy Gulik upon her marriage to Greg Gulik in 1994. Lily and Greg divorced in 2019.

By 1995, the company had approximately 10 employees and by 1997, it had about 25. After the acquisition by Verio in April, 1998, WWA/Verio Chicago grew to around 45 employees.

Services 
WorldWide Access offered typical ISP accounts of the era, including terminal dial-up into BSD/OS UNIX shell systems, SLIP, and PPP; web hosting; UUCP and mail hosting; DNS registration and hosting; and leased-line circuits.  The company also offered tech support for Macintosh computers, which was somewhat of a rarity at the time.  WorldWide Access focused its sales efforts on signup up corporate clients but the company also served thousands of residential customers.  The company focused heavily on customer service excellence and was considered to be one of the better ISP operations in the Chicago area.  WWA was rumored to be one of the rare profitable ISPs that had been obtained by Verio during its acquisition binge of the late '90s.

WWA used a take-out sashimi menu from a sushi restaurant to choose hostnames for its systems. At the time of the Verio acquisition, the menu had been nearly exhausted.

UNIX shell and dialup accounts 
WWA offered shell accounts from inception, starting out as the Gagme Public Access UNIX (pubnix) system originally operated by Greg Gulik. Gagme subscriber accounts were served up on a Linux machine named gagme, while the news server was named serveme, while a third machine (whyme) was more or less the personal server for Lily Moy, the future Mrs. Greg Gulik.  WWA's shell accounts landed a user on his or her "home" server, one of four BSD/OS Intel machines:  sake, sashimi, miso, and shoga.  As late as 1998, WWA support knew of at least one customer still using a Commodore 64 machine to dial in.

Additionally, WWA offered the ubiquitous dialup SLIP/PPP service to customers.  WWA was the first ISP in Chicago to offer dialup access as far out as Rockford, IL, and Milwaukee, WI, doing so by operating physical points of presence.  One of the Chicago POPs was located at Marist High School.

MagicServer 
WWA was one of the first ISPs in the Chicago area to capitalize on virtual web hosting, by custom-coding virtual hosting into the NCSA httpd webserver before it was a core part of the product.  This service was called MagicServer (another service mark of the corporation).  The MagicServer version of httpd worked around some of the problems that plagued other implementations, such as the number of open file descriptors on the system, but had issues of its own which led to its eventual abandonment in favor of the standard built-in Apache virtual hosting.

MagicServer hosts originally also ran on the BSD/OS shell servers, but were relocated to Sun SPARC hosts running Solaris in 1996.  These were tako and anago, and later gari and soba were added.

DNS and IRC 
WWA provided DNS hosting to its customers on kani and tau.  WWA was a long-time root nameserver for the *.chi.il.us domain.

Additionally, tau, which had been inherited from an ISP in Rockford IL (MISHA.NET) which WWA acquired, served as irc.Chicago.il.undernet.org.  Tau was one of the few machines not to carry a sushi-related hostname.

Usenet news 
WWA operated one of several full Usenet feeds in the area, trading articles cooperatively with most local ISPs and other large providers such as the University of Illinois.

WWA switched from local disk early on to a NetApp filer, which allowed WWA to run INN substantially more efficiently than previous.  The main newsserver was kirin, and later hirame was added as a read-only newsserver.

KidCam 
WorldWide Access later added Jeff Gerhardt as its Director of Business Development.   Circa 1998,  Gerhardt and Kathleen Vrona were later responsible for creating KidCam, which was Internet-accessible streaming video from local locations so parents could watch their kids from daycare or school remotely.

Notable challenges

My Fone Sux 
The bulk of the company's revenue was generated by the commercial accounts, but dialup accounts did comprise the majority part of WWA's actual end-users—and dialup offered easily the most problems, as during that point in time, Ameritech and MFS (later SBC and AT&T, and WorldCom, respectively) were going through growing pains due to the exploding popularity of the Internet.  Customers' dialup calls were often dropped or of such low line quality that little bandwidth could be sustained.

By the spring of 1996, competition among the ILEC and CLECs was getting rough, and the phone companies began to offer virtual points of presence:  they would trunk in phone lines to a central location which offered a telephone prefix which was local to various other parts of the city, which allowed customers to dial into a phone line which was in their local (untimed) calling radius without forcing the ISPs to operate remote POPs, physical offices with networking gear and modems, in various places around the city just to be able to offer customers local dialin numbers.

WorldWide Access was one of the first ISPs to choose MFS for this rather than using the ILEC, Ameritech's, competing product, the Ameritech Virtual Network (AVN).  MFS's virtual phone circuits were plagued with problems for at least six weeks that spring, during which time customers had extreme reliability problems.  The phrase 'My Fone Sux' was coined on the local wwa.* Usenet groups.

Won't Work Always was another nickname which resulted from the MFS fiasco.

The great Holio flood 
One weekend in May 1997, a Civic Opera tenant on the ninth floor had some problems with a large air-conditioning unit.  On the fifth floor, the plumbing into which that chiller exhausted its water clogged, and the grey water began backing up.  It began flooding out onto the fifth floor, but as it could not back up as quickly as the chiller was exhausting it, the backup climbed to the sixth floor and eventually began pouring out of a sink located in a utility closet in one of WWA's two neighboring seventh-floor suites.

Two WWA employees had been scheduled to perform routine off-hours maintenance on the DNS servers that Monday morning.  By the time they arrived at the office around 2 o'clock AM, the hallway leading from the elevators to the office was noticeably humid, and the carpet nearest the office was actively squishing.

The planned maintenance was sidelined as the two staffers began to rescue soaking boxes of paper records and computers from the office (which was nicknamed "the Holio").  Several desktop computers, which had been stashed underneath desks to release more room for already-crowded workspaces, were still running in the water—and at least one production server, a Windows NT web hosting machine, was several inches deep and still serving web pages.  Meanwhile, the main WWA office, which housed the machine room, remained dry, as the plumbing to its kitchen was separate from the clogged drain line twenty yards to the east.

Within hours, the hallway to the main WWA office was completely lined on both sides by piles of soaking wet stuff.  It took days to get most of the water removed from the suite.  Over the next few weeks, a staged evacuation from the Holio was forced as the original rock maple flooring warped—in places to heights of six- or eight-inch waves—dislodging furniture, while mold proliferated in the carpeting and carpet padding, making the office uninhabitable.

WWA subsequently relocated to a new, larger suite on the nineteenth floor.

Acquisition and the local competitors 
WorldWide Access was ultimately only one of several Chicago-based small Internet providers, which, in the end, were nearly all swallowed up by larger providers.  WWA was the first to be sold, to Verio, in April 1998.

 EnterAct was acquired in 1998 by 21st Century, which was in turn later acquired by RCN Communications
 American Information Systems ("AISNet") was acquired in 1999 by Exodus Communications
 MCSNet was acquired in August 1998 by Winstar Communications
 Tezcatlipoca ("Tezcat") was acquired in 2000 by Ripco
 InterAccess was acquired in 2000 by Allegiance Telecom

Of the major local providers, only Ripco remained unsold, and it still operates independently as of 2017.

References 
 

Companies based in Chicago
Telecommunications companies established in 1993
Internet service providers of the United States